"Drowning" is a song by American boy band Backstreet Boys, released on September 25, 2001, as the only single from their compilation album, The Hits – Chapter One.

Background
The song was written by Andreas Carlsson, Rami and Linda Thompson, and produced by Rami and Kristian Lundin. The song was initially recorded for the Black & Blue album but was excluded due to the limited track listings left. Several elements of the song, such as the piano intro and the chorus, are very similar to "Långsamt farväl" released by the Swedish artist Mauro Scocco in 1997. Andreas Carlsson, co-writer of "Drowning", sang backing vocals on Lisa Nilsson's version of "Långsamt farväl" released in 2003. In Finland, "Drowning" was compared to the 1995 song "Älä sano huomisesta" by Hausmylly.

Chart performance
The song peaked at number 28 on the US Billboard Hot 100 on November 13, 2001. It reached the top ten in several European countries, reaching number three in Sweden, number four in the UK, and number five in Norway.

Music videos

Official version
The official music video was directed by Nigel Dick, who directed their music videos for "As Long as You Love Me" and "All I Have to Give". It featured the band gathered around monuments and an old building resembling a church.

The video is notable for its frequent used of the contre-jour technique, which puts the subject directly against the source of light, thus giving a clear, dark outline of the figure. In the video, the group are often seen as silhouettes moving and singing against the background. This was filmed in Los Angeles.

Unreleased version
Before the final video was produced, a different concept was in production. The concept was eventually abandoned and the official video was produced instead. One of the preliminary cuts of this original video was leaked to the public. This video was done, then canceled and replaced by the end of the month.

It features the band members dressed in black outfits, which can be seen in the photograph on the CD single cover. The video was shot mainly using green screen to place the band on an arid salt flat. The sun is initially shining, but dark clouds quickly fill the sky in the first chorus, and it begins to rain in the second verse. A flood of water fills the area and the storm continues to get worse. At the key change, and at the end of the song, the band members are hit with a large wave. Through the rest of the video they simply sing in a shallow depth of water.

Track listings

UK CD1
 "Drowning" (short radio edit) – 4:10
 "Everybody (Backstreet's Back)" (Sharp London vocal mix) – 7:58
 "I Want It That Way" (Morales club version) – 7:25

UK CD2
 "Drowning" (radio edit) – 4:13
 "Drowning" (Dezrok radio mix) – 4:04
 "Drowning" (Rizzo & Harris radio mix) – 4:02
 "Drowning" (video) – 4:32

UK cassette single
 "Drowning" (radio edit) – 4:13
 "As Long as You Love Me" (Jason Nevins radio mix) – 3:38
 "All I Have to Give" (Soul Solution club mix) – 7:36

European CD single
 "Drowning" – 4:25
 "Back to Your Heart" – 4:21

Australian CD single
 "Drowning" – 4:25
 "Back to Your Heart" – 4:21
 "Shape of My Heart" (video) – 3:50

Japanese CD single
 "Drowning" (album version)
 "The One" (album version)
 "Drowning" (TV track)
 "The One" (instrumental)

Personnel 
 Kristian Lundin – producer, recording engineer, mix engineer
 Rami – producer, recording engineer, mix engineer
 John Amatiello – assistant recording engineer, Pro Tools engineer
 Thomas Lindberg – bass
 Esbjörn Öhrwall – guitar
 Jonathan Lindström – pedal steel guitar
 Tom Coyne – mastering

Charts

Weekly charts

Year-end charts

Certifications

Release history

In popular culture
"Drowning" and their other single "The One" were both licensed and used in the 2002–2003 anime television series Hanada Shōnen Shi. "Drowning" was used for the ending theme, while "The One" was the opening theme.

References

2001 singles
2001 songs
Backstreet Boys songs
Jive Records singles
Music videos directed by Nigel Dick
Song recordings produced by Rami Yacoub
Songs written by Andreas Carlsson
Songs written by Linda Thompson (actress)
Songs written by Rami Yacoub
UK Independent Singles Chart number-one singles